Franz Ferdinand, Duke of Hohenberg (13 September 1927 – 16 August 1977), was the eldest son of Maximilian, Duke of Hohenberg and Countess Maria of Waldburg zu Wolfegg und Waldsee. He was also a grandson of Archduke Franz Ferdinand of Austria and his morganatic wife Sophie, Duchess of Hohenberg. As a result of that morganatic marriage, the Hohenbergs were excluded from the line of succession to the Austro-Hungarian throne.

Following the socialist take-over in Vienna during the chaos at the close of The Great War and their exiling of the monarchy, all Austrian titles were subsequently abolished by law in 1919. From then on, names officially consisted only of forename and surname, without von or titles, scilicet Franz Ferdinand Hohenberg. Most simply ignored this Decree.

Family
He was born His Serene Highness Prince Franz Ferdinand of Hohenberg, but upon the death of his father in 1962, he became the 2nd Duke of Hohenberg and Head of the House of Hohenberg.

On 9 May 1956 in Luxembourg, Prince Franz married Princess Elisabeth of Luxembourg, a daughter of Charlotte, Grand Duchess of Luxembourg. They had two daughters:
 Princess Anna (Anita) Charlotte Maximiliana Euphemia Maria Helena of Hohenberg (born 18 August 1958, Berg Castle). She married Romee de La Poeze, Count d'Harambure on 22 July 1978. They have four children. In 1998 they divorced and on 9 July 2005 she married Count Andreas von Bardeau.
 Princess Sophie Felicitas Elisabetha Bona Maria Antonia of Hohenberg (born 10 May 1960) married Jean-Louis de Potesta on 18 June 1983. They have three children.

Since he had no sons, he was succeeded by his younger brother Georg as Duke of Hohenberg and head of the House of Hohenberg.

Ancestry

|-

Austrian nobility
Hohenberg family
1927 births
1977 deaths